Charlie Creek is a stream in Hardee County and Polk County, Florida, in the United States.

Charlie Creek was named in honor of Charlie Apopka, chief of the Seminole.

See also
List of rivers of Florida

References

Rivers of Hardee County, Florida
Rivers of Polk County, Florida
Rivers of Florida